Sangrur Lok Sabha constituency is one of the 13 Lok Sabha (parliamentary) constituencies in Punjab state in northern India.

Assembly segments
Presently, Sangrur Lok Sabha constituency comprises the following nine Vidhan Sabha (legislative assembly) segments:

Members of Parliament

^ by-poll

Election results

2022 by-election
Incumbent Sangrur Lok Sabha constituency MP Bhagwant Mann had contested in the Punjab Assembly election and won. AAP won a large majority of 92 out of total 117 seats. Mann was designated as the Chief Minister of Punjab. Before taking the oath as CM of Punjab, Bhagwant Mann resigned from his post of MP Sangrur. By-election to Sangrur Lok Sabha constituency was held on 23 June 2022. Simranjit Singh Mann was declared the winner 26 June 2022.

2019

2014

2009

2004

1999

1998

1996

Notes

External links
Sangrur lok sabha constituency election 2019 result details

Lok Sabha constituencies in Punjab, India
Sangrur district

See also

 Sangrur district Dhuri of Sangrur District was part of Ropar parliament constituency.
 List of Constituencies of the Lok Sabha